is a Japanese long jumper. His personal best jump is 8.20 metres, achieved in June 2004 in Tottori.

He won the bronze medal at the 2003 Asian Championships. He also competed at the 2004 Olympic Games and the 2005 World Championships without reaching the final.

Competition record

National titles
Japanese Championships
Long jump: 2002, 2003, 2004, 2005

References

External links

Shinichi Terano at JOC 
Shinichi Terano at TBS  (archived)

1979 births
Living people
Sportspeople from Osaka Prefecture
Japanese male long jumpers
Olympic male long jumpers
Olympic athletes of Japan
Athletes (track and field) at the 2004 Summer Olympics
Asian Games competitors for Japan
Athletes (track and field) at the 2002 Asian Games
Japan Championships in Athletics winners